Carb or CARB may refer to:

 Carbohydrate, a simple molecule
 Carburetor, a device that blends air and fuel for an internal combustion engine
 California Air Resources Board, in the government of California, US

See also
 Karb (disambiguation)